Murray North station  is a light rail station in Murray, Utah, United States serviced by the Blue Line and the Red Line of Utah Transit Authority's TRAX light rail system. The Blue Line provides service from Downtown Salt Lake City to Draper. The Red Line provides service from the University of Utah to the Daybreak community of South Jordan.

Description
The station is located at 71 West Fireclay Avenue (4295 South)  and is easily accessed from State Street (US-89) by heading west on Fireclay Avenue.  The station is also accessible from 4500 South (SR-266) by heading north on Main Street the then west on Fireclay Avenue. There is substantial transit-oriented development under construction near the station. The station has a Park and Ride lot with 235 free parking spaces available. The station opened on 4 December 1999 as part of the first operating segment of the TRAX system and is operated by the Utah Transit Authority

Notes

References

TRAX (light rail) stations
Railway stations in the United States opened in 1999
Railway stations in Salt Lake County, Utah
1999 establishments in Utah